Elmer Plummer (November 6, 1910 - December 31, 1986) was an American water color painter who was active and worked at Walt Disney Animation Studios and Warner Bros. Cartoons.

Biography
Plummer was born in Redlands, California, in 1910 and attended military school in San Diego before receiving a scholarship to study at the Chouinard Art Institute, where he returned as a teacher in later life.

In 1934, he joined Warner Bros as a studio artist, then joined the Walt Disney Studios where he worked on films including Fantasia and Dumbo.

He was also active in water colour painting for the Works Progress Administration and as a member of the Painters and Sculptors of Los Angeles. He exhibited works at the Art Institute of Chicago, the Golden Gate International Exposition, and won awards from the Los Angeles Art Association, the Pennsylvania Academy of the Fine Arts, and the Los Angeles County Fair, and California State Fair.

He retired to in Junction City, Oregon, where he died in 1986, at his age of 76.

Filmography

References

External links 

American animators
American male painters
Walt Disney Animation Studios people
Warner Bros. Cartoons people
1910 births
1986 deaths